Stephanie Skilton (born 27 October 1994 in Auckland, New Zealand) is an association footballer who has represented New Zealand at international level by being capped in the New Zealand women's national football team.

Skilton was a member of the New Zealand U-17 side at the 2010 FIFA U-17 Women's World Cup in Trinidad and Tobago, making two appearances.

She played in all three of New Zealand's games at the 2012 FIFA U-20 Women's World Cup in Japan where they were eliminated at the group stages.

At the 2014 FIFA U-20 Women's World Cup in Canada, Skilton played in all three of New Zealand's group games and the quarter final match which they lost to Nigeria.

Skilton made her senior début as a substitute in a 1–2 loss to Switzerland on 7 March 2014.

References

External links

1994 births
Living people
New Zealand women's association footballers
New Zealand women's international footballers
Syracuse Orange women's soccer players
Women's association football forwards
2019 FIFA Women's World Cup players